South Gate is an unincorporated community in Whitewater Township, Franklin County, Indiana, USA.

History
South Gate was platted in 1850 by Richard Wood. The South Gate post office was discontinued in 1941.

References

Unincorporated communities in Franklin County, Indiana
Unincorporated communities in Indiana